Dick Thompson is the name of:

 Dick Thompson (racing driver) (1920–2014), American racing driver and dentist
 Dick Thompson (athlete), British Paralympic athlete
 Dick Thompson or Richard Thompson (animator) (1914–1998), American animator

See also
Richard Thompson (disambiguation)
Richard Thomson (disambiguation)